Gusty Gully is a small north-south valley, the upper portion of which is occupied by a glacier, between Mount Kuipers and Knobhead in the Quartermain Mountains of Victoria Land, Antarctica.

References

Valleys of Victoria Land
Scott Coast